Harry George Otis (October 5, 1886 – January 29, 1976) nicknamed "Cannonball" was an American Major League Baseball pitcher who played for one season. He pitched five games for the Cleveland Naps during the 1909 Cleveland Naps season.

References

 https://www.baseball-reference.com/players/o/otisha01.shtml

External links

1886 births
1976 deaths
Cleveland Naps players
Major League Baseball pitchers
Baseball players from New Jersey
Goldsboro Giants players
Columbus Foxes players
People from West New York, New Jersey
Sportspeople from Hudson County, New Jersey